Opoul-Périllos is a commune in the Pyrénées-Orientales department in southern France.

Geography 
Opoul-Périllos is located in the canton of La Vallée de l'Agly and in the arrondissement of Perpignan.

The commune's highest point, Montoliu de Perellós (707 meters, a summit located next to the river Aude), stands as the northernmost point in Catalan-speaking countries.

Opoul-Périllos spreads over a large area of 5,053 hectares (12,486 acres). In its present form it dates from January 1, 1972, when both villages where integrated into one single commune (Perellós, a tiny hamlet located some 10 km up into the mountain, had been virtually deserted since the end of World War II, the 1968 census returning just 4 inhabitants).

The area is dominated by limestone with numerous karst (caves, crevices, sinkholes). The village lies in a depression where the limestone is mixed with red clay. The town is crossed from north to south by Ròbol, a tributary of the Aglí river.

The main (and almost, only) crop is the vineyard.

Etymology
The village of Opoul is mentioned as Oped at about 1100, and as Opidum in 1149. These repeated spellings leave no doubt about the etymology: Òpol derives from oppidum, Latin for "fortress". However, the transition from Oped to Òpol (Opulo and Castell d'Òpol on the 13th and 14th centuries, respectively) is rather surprising. It would be logical to assume *Opedol as a diminutive form of Oped, which could have designated a small castle in the village as opposed to the fortress which dominates it (it is worth mentioning that the medieval fortress overlooking the village has been known as "castell de Salvaterra" from the 13th century onwards (salvaterra being Catalan for "safe land", "asylum place").

Périllos is also mentioned in 1100 (Perelons), then Perillons and Perellons in the 13th century. The current spelling started to be used during the following century and guards no relation with the Catalan adjective for "dangerous" (perillós). Perellós is generally assumed to be a place where perelloner (Catalan for "wild pear tree" or "dogwood tree", amelanchier ovalis or pyrus spinosa species) grows. However, the hypothesis of a "stony place" (pedregós in modern Catalan) cannot be totally ruled out.

Demography 
Opoul's population was 135 fires (focs) in 1365, no more than 150 inhabitants (A foc was a medieval Catalan census measure for hearth tax purposes: 35 focs would amount to approximately some 150 inhabitants). Doubtlessly affected by great plagues and wars, population was down to 3 fires by the early 16th century. It was during the 19th century that population growth reached its peak, bolstered by a lower mortality rate and the development of viticulture: 701 inhabitants in 1836, 1157 in 1886. Then, the rural exodus and the Great French Wine Blight crisis led to a fairly sharp drop: there were just 702 inhabitants in 1926, 570 in 1946, with an all-time low of 482 inhabitants in 1975. The situation has improved over the last 30 years, and there were 595 inhabitants in the 2005 census.

As for Périllos, a village virtually cut off from the world, its decline was inevitable: after reaching a peak of 85 in 1861, population fell to 8 people in 1946, the last birth being registered in 1916. At the time of its aggregation to Opoul (1972), the village was already deserted.

Sites of interest 
 The hamlet of Périllos
 The ruins of the Opoul castle
 The Saint-Laurent romanesque church in Opoul

See also
Communes of the Pyrénées-Orientales department

References

External links

Website of Opoul 
Local information on the commune 

Communes of Pyrénées-Orientales